This is a list of the European Hot 100 Singles and European Top 100 Albums number ones of 1987, as published by Music & Media magazine.

Chart history

References

Europe
1987
1987